Gyrinocheilus pustulosus (common name: Borneo algae-eater) is a species of cyprinid of the genus Gyrinocheilus. It inhabits the Kapuas, Mahakam and Kayan basins of Indonesian Borneo. It is ten dorsal soft rays and 39 or 40 vertebrae. It was described by George Clapp Vaillant in 1902. It is classified as "data deficient" on the IUCN Red List and considered harmless to humans.

References

Cyprinid fish of Asia
IUCN Red List data deficient species
Fish of Indonesia
Taxa named by Léon Vaillant
Fish described in 1902